The 1244 siege of Jerusalem took place after the Sixth Crusade, when a Khwarazmian army conquered the city on July 15, 1244.

Prelude
Emperor Frederick II of the Holy Roman Empire led the Sixth Crusade from 1228 to 1229 and claimed the title of King of Jerusalem as the husband of Isabella II of Jerusalem, queen since 1212. The army brought by the emperor and his reputation in the Muslim world were enough to recover Jerusalem, Bethlehem, Nazareth and several strongholds without fighting, as signed by a treaty with the Ayyubid Sultan al-Kamil. However, Jerusalem did not remain in the hands of Christians for long, as, despite further territorial gains a few years earlier in the Barons' Crusade, the latter did not control the surroundings of the city sufficiently to be able to ensure an effective defense.

The Khwarazmian army consisted of 10,000 cavalry, comprising both some of the remnants of the predominantly Kipchak army of the last Khwarazmshah, Jalal al-Din Mangburni, and the Kurdish Qaymariyya. They were acting in concert with the Ayyubid sultan.

Battle
In 1244, the Ayyubids allowed the Khwarazmians, whose empire had been destroyed by the Mongols in 1231, to attack the city. The siege took place on 15 July, and the city fell rapidly. The Khwarazmians plundered the Armenian Quarter, where they decimated the Christian population, and drove out the Jews. In addition, they sacked the tombs of kings of Jerusalem in the Church of the Holy Sepulchre and dug out their bones, in which the tombs of Baldwin I and Godfrey of Bouillon became cenotaphs. On 23 August, the Tower of David surrendered to the Khwarazmian forces, some 6,000 Christian men, women and children marched out of Jerusalem.

Aftermath
The sack of the city and the massacre which accompanied it prompted the Crusaders to assemble a force to join the Ayyubid forces and fight against the Egyptian and Khwarazmian forces in the Battle of La Forbie. Moreover, the events encouraged the king of France Louis IX to organize the Seventh Crusade.

References

External links
The Siege on Orthodox Wiki
The Siege on Encyclopædia Britannica
The Siege on WZO.org, Timeline: History of Jerusalem
The Siege on The Jewish History Resource Center

Jerusalem
13th-century massacres
1244
Military history of the Crusader states between the Sixth and Seventh Crusades
Jerusalem
Jerusalem
1244 in Europe
1244 in Asia
Jerusalem (1244)
Massacres of Christians
Jerusalem (1244)
1240s in the Ayyubid Sultanate